Falakata College, established on 19 September 1981, is general degree college in Falakata. It is in Alipurduar district. It offers undergraduate courses in Arts. It is affiliated to  University of North Bengal, and enlisted Under Section 2 (f) and 12 (B) of the U.G.C. Act., managed by a Governing Body under the control of Directorate of Public Instruction, West Bengal.

The college is situated in Falakata, about 1 km from the National Highway 31. The College Campus is being divided into two parts, a two storied new building and the other is the old one storied building, midst which there is a playground.

Affiliation
The college is recognized by the University Grants Commission (UGC), and affiliated to North Bengal University.

See also

References

External links
Falakata College
University of North Bengal
University Grants Commission
National Assessment and Accreditation Council

Universities and colleges in Alipurduar district
Colleges affiliated to University of North Bengal
Educational institutions established in 1981
1981 establishments in West Bengal